The Mayor of South Yorkshire is a combined authority mayor, first elected in May 2018, who chairs the South Yorkshire Mayoral Combined Authority. The office is currently held by Oliver Coppard.

The office was created under the Cities and Local Government Devolution Act 2016 which allowed for the creation of 'Metro mayors' to lead combined authorities in England. Between 2018 and September 2021, the office was known as the "Mayor of the Sheffield City Region".

List of mayors

References

Sheffield
Directly elected mayors in England and Wales